The 5th Avenue is a candy bar introduced in 1936, consisting of peanut butter crunch layers enrobed in chocolate. It is produced and marketed by The Hershey Company.

The bar is similar to the Clark Bar which was first produced in Pittsburgh in 1917 by the D.L. Clark Company, now produced by the Boyer Candy Company of Altoona, Pennsylvania. 
It is also similar in composition to the Butterfinger candy bar, first developed and manufactured by Curtiss Candy Company, later manufactured by successors including Nestlé and Ferrara.

History 
The candy bar was introduced in 1936 by Luden's, at the time a subsidiary of Food Industries of Philadelphia. The name was an attempt to associate the candy with fashionable 5th Avenue in New York City.
Hershey Foods Corporation acquired Luden's brands from the Dietrich Corporation, a successor to Food Industries of Philadelphia, in 1986. Despite not being advertised since 1993, the candy bar is still available in many smaller retailers.

The candy bar was a huge favorite of H. Clay Earles, founder of Virginia's Martinsville Speedway, and it was the only candy sold as a concession at the track until his death in 1999.

In popular culture
This candy appeared in the 1994 sci-fi movie Stargate and the Seinfeld episodes "The Switch" and "The Dealership".

See also
 Butterfinger
 Clark Bar
 List of chocolate bar brands
 List of peanut dishes

References

External links
 

 

Chocolate bars
The Hershey Company brands
Peanut butter confectionery
Products introduced in 1936
Brand name confectionery